William Allan (footballer) may refer to:

Bill Allan (1870–1948), goalkeeper for Montrose and Sheffield Wednesday 
William Allan (footballer, born 1880) (1880–1965), Scottish goalkeeper for Falkirk, Rangers and Hibernian 
William Allan (footballer, born 1904) (1904–1969), Scottish defender for Hamilton and Motherwell
Willie Allan (born 1942), Scottish forward for Aberdeen, St Mirren, Falkirk, Morton and Alloa

See also
Bill Allen (footballer) (1889–1948), Australian rules footballer (Melbourne)
Billy Allen (1917–1981), English footballer for York City
Will Allen (cornerback) (born 1978), American football cornerback (New York Giants, Miami Dolphins) and convicted fraudster
Will Allen (safety) (born 1982), American football safety (Pittsburgh Steelers)